Typhlomangelia polythele is a species of sea snail, a marine gastropod mollusk in the family Borsoniidae.

Description

Distribution
This marine species occurs off South Africa and in the Mozambique Channel.

References

 Barnard, Keppel Harcourt. Deep sea Mollusca from west of Cape Point, South Africa. South African Museum, 1963.

External links
  Bouchet P., Kantor Yu.I., Sysoev A. & Puillandre N. (2011) A new operational classification of the Conoidea. Journal of Molluscan Studies 77: 273–308 
  Alexander V. Sysoev, Taxonomic notes on South African deep-sea conoidean gastropods (Gastropoda: Conoidea) described by K.H. Barnard; The Nautilus 110 (1) (1996)
 Biolib.cz: original image of Typhlomangelia polythele
 MNHN, Paris: Typhlomangelia polythele

polythele
Gastropods described in 1963